Anthene kersteni, the Kersten's hairtail or Kersten's ciliate blue, is a butterfly of the family Lycaenidae. It is found from South Africa to Kenya, Uganda, and Ethiopia. In South Africa it is found in coastal lowland forest in KwaZulu-Natal, from the coast to Kosi Bay, inland across the Makathini Flats.

The wingspan is 26–28 mm for males and 23–29 mm for females. Adults are on wing year-round, with a peak in summer.

The larvae feed on Acacia species, including and Acacia kraussiana and Albizia adianthifolia.

References

Butterflies described in 1871
Anthene
Butterflies of Africa
Taxa named by Carl Eduard Adolph Gerstaecker